Manuel Macías y Casado, OIC (November 3, 1844
 – November 7, 1937) was a Spanish general. He served as Governor-General of Puerto Rico during the Spanish–American War and as governor of Melilla (in three separate terms), and occupied various other posts. Born in Teruel, Spain, Macías attended the Colegio de Infantería and became a sub-lieutenant at the age of 17. He became a lieutenant in Cuba on January 1, 1863. In December 1863 he was transferred to Santo Domingo. He was promoted to captain in March 1864. He remained in Santo Domingo until 1865.

From 1865 to April 1875, he was stationed again in Cuba. He saw action on Cuba during the Ten Years' War and was promoted to lieutenant colonel and then colonel in March 1874.

He returned to Spain in 1875 and was stationed at Melilla until 1886, and then afterwards at Albacete and Santander. He became a general on June 9, 1891 and was made governor of Cartagena. He was then stationed at Valencia and afterwards Melilla, where he served as military governor (1893–94). He was made Lieutenant General and was named Captain General of the Canary Islands in August 1894. After 1894, Julio Cervera Baviera, later a pioneer in the development of radio, served as aide-de-camp to Macías in the latter's various assignments.

Puerto Rico
On January 17, 1898, Macías was named Governor General and Captain General of Puerto Rico.

With the eruption of the Spanish–American War, Macías declared martial law, resolving to resist the American forces. He declared: "Providence will not permit that in these countries which were discovered by the Spanish nation the echo of our language should ever cease to be heard, nor that our flag should disappear before the eyes. ... Long live Puerto Rico, always Spanish. Long live Spain." Macías hoped that a grant of autonomy would ensure that Puerto Ricans would remain loyal to the Spanish crown. However, he had few military resources with which to resist an American invasion: 8,000 regulars (which were scattered across various cities) and 700–900 volunteers (Puerto Rican militia). Ponce and Mayagüez had no defense forces, and the naval forces consisted only of 368 men.

After the defeat, he departed from Puerto Rico on October 16, 1898 on the steamship Covadonga with the majority of the Spanish troops. The fort of San Cristóbal gave the last Spanish governor of the island a farewell consisting of a salvo of 21 cannon shots. He entrusted General Ricardo de Ortega y Diez with the ceremony that marked the handover of the island to the United States, which occurred on October 18, 1898. After the war, Macías' former aide-de-camp, Cervera Baviera, gained notoriety as the author of a pamphlet called La defensa de Puerto Rico, which supported the actions of General Macias before the Spanish public but ended up criticizing the Puerto Rican volunteers in the Spanish Army.

After the Spanish–American War
He was afterwards named Captain General of Burgos, Navarre, and the Basque Country, and commander-in-chief of the 6th Army Corps.

The Spanish Civil War had been raging for one year when he died at Madrid in 1937. He was ninety-three years old.

Personal life
Macías married Concepción Ramírez de Arellano y Cortés (d. 1950). They had seven children: Manuel, Concepción, Carmen, Cristina, the twins Clotilde and Luisa, and Clemente.

See also
 Puerto Rican Campaign

References

External links
  Manuel Macías y Casado

Spanish generals
Royal Governors of Puerto Rico
Spanish military personnel of the Spanish–American War
1844 births
1937 deaths
People of the Ten Years' War